{{Speciesbox
| image = Acanthochelys spixii.jpg
| status = LR/nt
| status_system = IUCN2.3
| status_ref = 
| genus = Acanthochelys
| species = spixii
| authority = (A.M.C. Duméril & Bibron, 1835)
| synonyms = 
Emys depressa 
Emys aspera 
Platemys spixii  
Acanthochelys spixii 
| synonyms_ref = <ref name=ttwg>Turtle Taxonomy Working Group (van Dijk PP, Iverson JB, Rhodin AGJ, Shaffer HB, Bour R) (2014). "Turtles of the world, 7th edition: annotated checklist of taxonomy, synonymy, distribution with maps, and conservation status". In: Rhodin AGJ, Pritchard PCH, van Dijk PP, Saumure RA, Buhlmann KA, Iverson JB, Mittermeier RA (Editors) (2014) Conservation Biology of Freshwater Turtles and Tortoises: A Compilation Project of the IUCN/SSC Tortoise and Freshwater Turtle Specialist Group. Chelonian Research Monographs 5 (7): 000.329–000.479, doi:10.3854/ crm.5.000.checklist.v7.2014.</ref>
}}

The black spine-neck swamp turtle (Acanthochelys spixii), also commonly known as the spiny-neck turtle or Spix's sideneck turtle, is a species of turtle in the family Chelidae. The species is endemic to South America, specially in the Southern Cone region.

Etymology
The specific name, spixii, is in honor of German biologist Johann Baptist von Spix.

Geographic range
A. spixii is found in Argentina, Brazil, Uruguay, and possibly Paraguay.

References

Acanthochelys
Turtles of South America
Reptiles of Argentina
Reptiles of Brazil
Reptiles of Uruguay
Reptiles described in 1835
Taxa named by André Marie Constant Duméril
Taxa named by Gabriel Bibron
Taxonomy articles created by Polbot